Rowghani (also Romanized as Rowghanī; also known as Roghāniyeh and Rowqānīyeh) is a village in Kuhsar Rural District, in the Central District of Shazand County, Markazi Province, Iran. At the 2006 census, its population was 430, in 94 families.

References 

Populated places in Shazand County